The 1976 Madison Dukes football team was an American football team that represented Madison College (now known as James Madison University) during the 1976 NCAA Division II football season as an independent. Led by fifth-year head coach Challace McMillin, the Dukes compiled a record of 7–4.

Schedule

References 

Madison
James Madison Dukes football seasons
Madison Dukes football